Illustrated Apocalypse manuscripts are manuscripts that contain the text of Revelation or a commentary on Revelation and also illustrations. Most of these Apocalypses were written between 1250 and 1400. Careful, the English Apocalypses are part of a larger group of Apocalypses called: the Anglo-Norman Apocalypses.

Paul Meyer and Léopold Delisle, in their book L'Apocalypse en français au XIIIe siècle (Paris MS fr. 403), 2 vols., Paris, 1901, were the first scholars to try to list, describe and categorize the Apocalypse manuscripts.  

M. R. James also wrote about illustrated Apocalypse manuscripts in his book The Apocalypse in Art, London, 1931.

Since M. R. James' work, there have been a number of more recent studies by R. Freyhan, George Henderson, Peter Klein, Suzanne Lewis, Nigel Morgan and Lucy Sandler.

These manuscripts can be divided by the language and form of the Apocalypse text. Many manuscripts have a Latin text, others have an Anglo-Norman prose text and others have a French verse text combined with a Latin text. Two manuscripts do not have a separate text, but incorporate excerpts from the text into the illustrations.

The illustrations can be divided into several iconographic groups. 

This is a not exhaustive list of known English Apocalypse manuscripts of the 13th and 14th centuries.

Berlin, Kupferstichkabinet Blatt Inv. No. 1247
Brussels, Bibliothèque Royale MS II.282 Gulbenkian apocalypse
Cambridge, Corpus Christi College MS 20 : origin unknown (England or Northern France)Corpus Christi MS 20
Cambridge, Corpus Christi College MS 394 Corpus Christi MS 394
Cambridge, Fitzwilliam Museum MS Add. 317
Cambridge, Fitzwilliam Museum MS McClean 123 (Nuneaton Book)
Cambridge, Magdelene College MS F.4.5 (Crowland Apocalypse)
Cambridge, Magdelene College MS Pepys 1803 (Pepys Apocalypse): origin unknown (England or Northern France)
Cambridge, Trinity College MS B.10.2
Cambridge, Trinity College MS B.10.6 : origin unknown (England or Northern France)
Cambridge, Trinity College MS R.16.2  (Trinity Apocalypse) : origin unknown (England or Northern France)Trinity Apocalypse
Cambridge, University Library MS Gg 1.1
Copenhagen, Kongelige Bibliothek MS Thott 89.4
Dublin, Trinity College MS 64 (Dublin Apocalypse)
Eton College Library MS 177 (Eton Apocalypse)
Lisbon, Gulbenkian Museum MS L.A.139 (Gulbenkian Apocalypse)
London, British Library Add MS 18633 Add MS 18633
London, British Library Add MS 35166 Add MS 35166
London, British Library Add MS 38842 Add MS 38842
London, British Library Add MS 42555 Abingdon Apocalypse

London, British Library Royal MS 15 D II The Welles Apocalypse
London, British Library Royal MS 19 B XV Queen Mary Apocalypse
London, British Library Royal MS 2 D XIII Royal MS 2 D XIII
London, Lambeth Palace Library MS 209 Lambeth Apocalypse
London, Lambeth Palace Library MS 434
London, Lambeth Palace Library MS 75
Los Angeles, J. Paul Getty Museum MS Ludwig III.1  Getty (Dyson Perrins) Apocalypse
Metz, Bibliothèque Municipale MS Salis 38 (no longer extant) (Metz Apocalypse)
Moscow, State Lenin Library MS NH.1678
New York, Morgan Library 7 Museum MS M.524 (Morgan Apocalypse)
New York, Public Library MS Spencer 57 (Spencer Apocalypse)
Norwich, Central Library MS 287 (Norwich Apocalypse)
Oxford, Bodleian Library MS Ashmole 753
Oxford, Bodleian Library MS Auct D.4.14
Oxford, Bodleian Library MS Auct D.4.17 (Bodleian Apocalypse)
Oxford, Bodleian Library MS Bodley 401
Oxford, Bodleian Library MS Canonici Bibl.62 (Canonici Apocalypse)
Oxford, Bodleian Library MS Douce 180 Douce Apocalypse
Oxford, Bodleian Library MS Selden Supra 38 (Selden Apocalypse)
Oxford, Bodleian Library MS Tanner 184 (Tanner Apocalypse)
Oxford, Lincoln College MS lat.16
Oxford, New College MS D.65 (New College Apocalypse)
Oxford, University College MS 100
Paris, Bibliothèque de Arsenal MS 5214
Paris, Bibliothèque Nationale de France MS fr.403 (Paris Apocalypse)
Paris, Bibliothèque Nationale de France MS fr.9574
Paris, Bibliothèque Nationale de France MS lat.10474
Toulouse, Bibliothèque Municipale MS 815 Toulouse Apocalypse
Yorkshire Apocalypse, private collection (Yorkshire Apocalypse)

References

External links
Resources for English Apocalypse Manuscripts

Medieval literature
Types of illuminated manuscript